Ostateczny krach systemu korporacji (The Definitive Collapse of the Corporate System) is an album by Kult, released on May 4, 1998 through S.P. Records.

Track listing
 all tracks by Kult (music) and Kazik Staszewski (lyrics) except where noted.
 "Goopya peezda" – 4:30 ("Stoopid Kunt")
 "Panie Waldku, pan się nie boi, czyli Lewy czerwcowy" – 4:07 ("Mr. Waldek, Don't Be Afraid, or the Lefty June")
 "Grzesznik" – 4:18 ("The Sinner")
 "Gdy nie ma dzieci" – 2:57 ("When the Children are Away")
 "Z archiwum polskiego jazzu" – 3:50 ("From Archives of Polish Jazz") 
 "3 gwiazdy" – 5:11 ("3 Stars")
 "Poznaj swój raj" – 4:46 ("Know Thy Paradise")
 "Dziewczyna bez zęba na przedzie" – 6:38 ("The Girl Without a Tooth in Front")
 "Kto wie" – 5:06 ("Who knows")
 "Fever, Fever, Fever" – 4:18 (on the cover L. Rekarte / R. Lopez from fictional band The Liars, noted as a joke)
 "Jatne" – 6:31
 "Ja wiem to" – 4:34 ("I Know That")
 "Kto śmie traktować cię źle" – 4:43 ("Who Dares to Treat You Badly")
 "Idź przodem" – 5:17 ("Go In The Front")
 "Krew jak śnieg" – 4:35 ("Blood Like Snow")
 "Komu bije dzwon" – 3:43 ("For Whom the Bell Tolls")
 untitled hidden track

Singles 
all singles released in 1998 through S.P. Records
 "Panie Waldku, Pan się nie boi czyli lewy czerwcowy"
 "Komu bije dzwon"
 "Gdy nie ma dzieci"
 "Dziewczyna bez zęba na przedzie"

References 

Kult (band) albums
1998 albums